International Safety Products (ISP) is a company based in Merseyside, UK, that manufactures inflatable marine lifejackets and is an official importer, supplier and distributor of other marine survival products. The firm has a turnover in excess of £7m and employs more than 100 staff at its headquarters in Bootle and in Birkenhead.

History
ISP began trading in 1981. It was bought out by its management team, John Rogers and Geoff Billington, in 2008. Funding was provided by Alliance Fund Managers through the Merseyside Special Investment Fund and The Co-operative Bank.

Products
ISP manufactures more than 170,000 products a year.

In 2012, the firm completed a deal to supply all passenger boats operating in the Lake District with lifejackets.

ISP specialises in tactical waistcoats, used by armed forces, special forces and police forces around the world. It also produces a range of immersion suits under its own Intrepid brand.

In May 2012, ISP became the sole UK supplier of Duarry Challenger liferafts and rescue boats.

ISP also provides marine safety electronic products. In 2013, ISP signed a deal to become the UK distributor for the Ocean Signal brand of personal location devices. The firm is the sole UK supplier of the SeaMate HRU VE-1 disposable hydrostatic release unit. The product is designed to cut life rafts free from their parent boat on contact with water. Most hydrostatic release units have a working lifespan of around two years. The SeaMate HRU VE-1 model has been designed to last more than 50% longer and needs replacing at three year intervals.

References

Manufacturing companies of the United Kingdom